The 2015 DFL-Supercup was the sixth edition of the German Super Cup under the name DFL-Supercup, an annual football match contested by the winners of the previous season's Bundesliga and DFB-Pokal competitions. It featured Bayern Munich, the winners of the 2014–15 Bundesliga, and VfL Wolfsburg, the winners of the 2014–15 DFB-Pokal.

Bayern lost 2–0 in the previous edition, to Borussia Dortmund.

The match was played on 1 August 2015. Wolfsburg defeated Bayern Munich 5–4 on penalties after the match had ended 1–1.

Teams
In the following table, matches until 1996 were in the DFB-Supercup era, since 2010 were in the DFL-Supercup era.

Match

Summary
Arjen Robben had put Bayern Munich ahead in the 49th minute from close range after goalkeeper Koen Casteels had fumbled a cross from the left from Douglas Costa. Nicklas Bendtner leveled the game in the 89th minute scoring at the near post after a cross from Kevin De Bruyne from the right. Bendtner went on to score the decisive penalty in the penalty shoot-out shooting high into the top left corner as Wolfsburg won 5–4.

Details

References

2015
VfL Wolfsburg matches
FC Bayern Munich matches
2015–16 in German football cups
DFL-Supercup 2015